KHVH (830 kHz) is a commercial AM radio station in Honolulu, Hawaii.   It broadcasts a talk radio format and is owned by iHeartMedia, Inc.  Its studios and offices are on Iwilei Road in the Kalihi neighborhood of Honolulu.

KHVH is powered at 10,000 watts, using a non-directional antenna.  The transmitter is atop Kalia Tower, at the Hilton Hawaiian Village off Dillingham Boulevard near the Kapalama Canal.  It also transmits on Oceanic Spectrum digital channel 881 for the entire state of Hawaii.

Programming
Weekdays begin with a talk and information show hosted by Rick Hamada.  The rest of the weekday schedule is nationally syndicated conservative talk programs:  The Sean Hannity Show, The Glenn Beck Program, The Clay Travis and Buck Sexton Show, The Jesse Kelly Show, The Joe Pags Show and Coast to Coast AM with George Noory.  Due to time zone differences, Hannity, Kelly, Pags, Travis and Sexton's shows are all recorded and delayed for broadcast at Hawaiian time.  The 6 p.m. newscast from KHON-TV 2, Honolulu's Fox Network affiliate, is also carried on weeknights.

Weekends feature specialty shows on money, health, golf, real estate, home improvement and technology, some of which are paid brokered programming.  Syndicated weekend programs include The Kim Komando Show, The Weekend with Michael Brown and The Mark Moss Show as well as repeats of weekday programs.  KHVH is an affiliate of the Las Vegas Raiders Radio Network.  Most hours begin with an update from Fox News Radio.

History
Its original call sign was KIKI and it was powered at only 250 watts. Its studios were at 320 Ward Avenue. In the 1960s and 70s, KIKI had a Top 40 format and was an affiliate of the ABC Contemporary Network.

The original KHVH 990 signed on the air in 1957.  The call letters KHVH stand for Kaiser Hawaiian Village Hotel in Waikiki, originally owned by Henry J. Kaiser.  Today it is the Hilton Hawaiian Village Hotel.  KHVH 990 had its studios at the hotel.  The KHVH transmitting tower still stands atop the Hilton's Kalia Tower.  

In 1986 KIKI 830 flipped to oldies while the Top 40 hit radio format moved to its FM sister station, the former KMAI-FM.  It became KIKI-FM, known as "I94" (now co-owned "93.9 The Beat").  From 1986 through 1990, each year KIKI added an additional year to its repertoire; e.g., if it were playing songs from artists up until 1960, beginning January 1, it would then add songs from 1961, maintaining its oldies format.

In 1993, KIKI and KHVH swapped signals when the outlets became sister stations, owned by Clear Channel Communications based in San Antonio.  The oldies format and KIKI call letters moved to 990 AM, while the talk format and KHVH call sign moved to 830 AM.  The station once broadcast in AM stereo using the C-QUAM system.  In 2014, Clear Channel switched its corporate name to iHeartMedia, Inc.

Logo history
 Pre-1993 KIKI "83 AM Stereo" logo.

References

External links
FCC History Cards for KHVH

 KHVH AM830 official website

HVH
News and talk radio stations in the United States
Radio stations established in 1951
IHeartMedia radio stations
1951 establishments in Hawaii